Athanasios Demetrios Maroulis (born September 22, 1964) is an actor, vocalist and record producer born in Brooklyn, New York. He is the older brother of singer Constantine Maroulis and also has a sister, Anastasia.
Athan Maroulis formed the New York-based group Fahrenheit 451 (1984–1986), with whom he recorded his first commercially available album. Over the ensuing years, Maroulis established himself in a number of alternative musical genres including gothic, industrial and electronic. Stints with the Philadelphia-based Executive Slacks (1987–1990), as well as Tubalcain (1991–1993), followed.

After moving to Los Angeles he fronted Spahn Ranch (1993–2000). A diverse and fairly eclectic vocalist, Maroulis recorded a number of albums with a 1940s styled vocal/jazz combo named The Blue Dahlia (1999–2000). Maroulis remains active both behind and in front of the scenes, runs Sepiatone Records, a vintage vocal and jazz record label while continuing to lend his voice to various studio and film projects.

Maroulis has also completed over 250 compact disc reissues, and has produced and written liner notes on collections such as Orson Welles and The War of the Worlds, as well as compilations from Billie Holiday, Marvin Gaye and Miles Davis.

Vocalist discography

Fahrenheit 451
The House of Morals (1986)
The Gothic Years and After (2000)

Tubalcain
25 Assorted Needles (1992)
Left (1994)

Spahn Ranch
Collateral Damage (1993)
The Blackmail Starters Kit (1994)
Breath and Taxes (1994)
The Coiled One (1995)In Parts Assembled Solely (1996)Architecture (1997)Retrofit EP (1998)Beat Noir (1998)Anthology 1992-1994 (2000)Closure (2001)

Vampire RodentsGravity's Rim (1996)

The Blue DahliaThe Blue Dahlia (2000)A Tribute to Frank Sinatra (2001)

Black Tape for a Blue Girl
The Scavenger Bride (2002)
10 Neurotics (2009)

NOIR

NOIR: My Dear (2012)Darkly Near (2013)RE​:​MIT:TENT (2014)The Burning Bridge (2016)Reburning (2017)A Pleasure (2019)Just Fascination (2021)

Producer/Liner Notes Discography

Highlights include:

Various Artists: The Black Bible (1998)
Billie Holiday: Anthology 1944-1959 (2000)
Artie Shaw: The Best of the War Years (2001)
Orson Welles: The Very Best of (2001)
Jo Stafford: The Best of the War Years (2001)
Shuggie Otis: In Session (2002)
Miles Davis: From Cool to Bop/The Anthology (2002)
Django Reinhardt: Anthology 1934-1937 (2002)
The King Cole Trio: The MacGregor Anthology (2002)
Duke Ellington and His Famous Orchestra: The Best of the War Years (2003)Gypsy 83: Soundtrack (2003)
Leadbelly: The Best of (2003)
Charlie Parker: The New York Anthology 1950-1954 (2003)
Louis Prima and His Orchestra: The Best of the War Years (2003)
Marlene Dietrich: The Anthology 1930-1949 (2003)
Marilyn Monroe: Anthology (2003)
Gary Numan: Here in My Car/The Best of (2004)
Marvin Gaye: The Concert Anthology (2004)
Ray Charles: The Genius Anthology (2005)
Sarah Vaughan: Anthology (2005)
Various Artists: The Christmas Anthology (2005)
Ina Ray Hutton: The Definitive Collection 1934-1944 (2011)
Julie London: Silk And Satin - The Rare Songbook (2013)
Ministry: Trax! Box (2015)
Ike & Tina Turner: The Complete Pompeii Recordings 1968-1969 (2016)
Leæther Strip: The Zoth Ommog Years 1989 - 1999'' (2020)

References

External links
https://www.facebook.com/athan.maroulis
http://www.metropolis-records.com/artist/noir
VH1 biography

Living people
1964 births
People from Brooklyn
Record producers from New York (state)
American people of Greek descent